Willetton Senior High School (WSHS) is a public secondary school in Willetton, Western Australia,  south of the Perth central business district and  east of the port of Fremantle. The school opened in February 1977 with 77 students. As of 2022, it has an enrollment of 2,601 students, and employs 274 staff.

The student catchment area for WSHS encompasses the suburb of Willetton and part of the suburb of Bull Creek, which is shared with Leeming Senior High School and Rossmoyne Senior High School.

Campus 
There are seven main buildings, along with numerous transportable buildings, some many years old. A $5 million upgrade was completed in 2008 that resulted in the construction of a new gymnasium and several new facilities.

WSHS underwent a multimillion-dollar renovation and redevelopment that commenced in 2014. In the second semester of 2014, asbestos contamination was detected after construction workers found pieces of asbestos had fallen off the roof of a school building slated for demolition. The school was closed for a week so the site could be inspected. Teachers were sent to work from North Lake Senior High School where they connected with students via the internet so that classes could continue.

The following phase of the redevelopment, involving the construction of another block of classrooms, commenced in February 2022. It is expected to finish in May 2023.

Academic rankings 
The Year 12 cohorts at Willetton perform consistently well in the WACE school rankings, and the school ranks well when compared to other schools in Western Australia.

In 2017, Andreea Ioan won the Beazley Medal for the top ranked Vocational Education and Training student in Western Australia.

Special programs 
WSHS is one of 20 schools offering the Gifted and Talented Education (GATE) with entry through a centrally organised testing program. Entry to the science-focused Talented And Gifted (TAG) program is managed at the school level. The school offers a specialist fine arts course for Years 8 to 10 and a successful senior school art program. A specialist course in computing was the first of its kind in WA and has recently been expanded to include a multimedia stream. A specialist basketball course runs from Years 8 to 11 and offers students a TAFE Certificate II in Sport Coaching and Sport and Recreation. Both male and female teams have won multiple national championships. As of June 2019, WSHS introduced a program called the eSports Club where all students can prepare for a sports competition and practice against other local schools. Some of the team names include WSHS eSports and DLGC.

International relations 
WSHS has a sister school relationship with the High School and Junior High School of University of Hyogo located in Kamigōri, Ako District, Hyogo Prefecture, Japan. Cultural exchanges between the two schools commenced in 1995 and a collaborative international partnership was established in 2005. WSHS maintains relationships that provide opportunities for French and Italian language students to study overseas.

Incidents
On 11 May 2020, a 16-year-old male student was charged with illegal possession of a firearm after taking a gel blaster and a knife into the school. Crime Stoppers received a tipoff regarding the gun before the officers were called to the school at about 2:30pm. No other students were impacted, and the situation was well managed.

On 5 May 2022, a female student pleaded guilty to a charge of attempted murder after she stabbed a female teacher at WSHS in November 2021. The girl had a female accomplice, who has pleaded not guilty to the same charge. Although the intent was to wound the teacher fatally, the teacher was not injured seriously, receiving a  wound near the left armpit. The attacker was 14 years old at the time of the stabbing, and the accomplice 13.

Notable alumni

Ebony Antonio - Australian rules football player
James Hayward - member of the Western Australian Legislative Council since 2021
Luke Jackson - Australian rules football player
James McHale - Australian journalist and news presenter
Graham Polak - Australian rules football player
Chandrika Ravi - Indian-Australian model, dancer and actress
Luke Travers - Australian basketball player

See also

 List of schools in the Perth metropolitan area

References

Further reading

External links
 
 2009 Annual Report
 Curriculum Council school comparison statistics

Educational institutions established in 1977
Public high schools in Perth, Western Australia
Rock Eisteddfod Challenge participants
1977 establishments in Australia